Brandon Kemar Browner (born August 2, 1984) is a former American football cornerback and convicted felon. In 2005, Browner signed with the Denver Broncos as an undrafted free agent out of Oregon State. Browner played four seasons with the Calgary Stampeders of the Canadian Football League (CFL) where he was a three-time CFL All-Star and won a Grey Cup championship in 2008 before signing with the Seattle Seahawks before the 2011 season. After winning the Super Bowl with Seattle in 2013 and the New England Patriots in 2014, Browner became one of the few players to win two consecutive Super Bowls as a member of two teams. Browner is a convicted felon and is serving 8 years in prison for attempted murder.

Browner was a founding member of the Seahawks Legion of Boom defense. In 2011 he led the Seahawks with six interceptions and made the only Pro Bowl of his career.

High school career
Browner was a Prep Star West All-Region and All-Valley Mission League selection at Sylmar High School (northern area of Los Angeles) as a senior. He also earned Mission League MVP honors. As a junior, Browner played at James Monroe High School in North Hills, Los Angeles. During his prep career, he competed as a receiver where he accounted for 1,726 career yards and 24 touchdowns, and on defense as a cornerback where he recorded 16 career interceptions. As a senior, he also returned three punts for touchdowns. Browner also lettered in track and field at James Monroe, competing in the high jump, triple jump and 200 meters.

College career
Browner played in college for Oregon State University.  Browner redshirted in 2002 at Oregon State. He then went on to start in every game he played in for the Beavers.  Browner was named to the Freshman All-America teams by the Football Writers Association and The Sporting News in 2003. He was chosen Pac-10 Conference Freshman of the Year and was a member of the All-Pac-10 second-team. He ranked ninth in the nation with six interceptions and recorded 43 tackles (37 solo) with six pass breakups, two forced fumbles and three stops for losses as a redshirt freshman. He helped the program weather the 2002 departures of Dennis Weathersby, Calvin Carlyle and Terrell Roberts.

Browner added All-America and All-Pac-10 Conference honors from The NFL Draft Report in 2004. Lining up at right cornerback, he regularly faced the opponent's top receiver. Browner recorded 44 tackles (37 solo) with a sack, nine pass deflections and a blocked kick in 2004. He finished his two-year collegiate career with 87 tackles (74 solo), a 2-yard sack, five stops for losses of 16 yards, two forced fumbles, 15 pass deflections, six interceptions for 74 yards in returns, and a touchdown.

Professional career

Denver Broncos
Browner was signed as an undrafted free agent by the Denver Broncos in 2005. However, Browner fractured his left forearm August 20 against San Francisco, was placed on injured reserve on August 25, 2005, and he missed the entire 2005 season before being waived on July 24, 2006.

Calgary Stampeders
Browner signed with the Calgary Stampeders in 2006. His speed and competitive effort made him a fan favorite in his time with the team. He won the 2008 Grey Cup with Calgary and was named a CFL All-Star for the season. Browner was also selected to the CFL All-Star team after the 2009 season.

Seattle Seahawks
Browner signed with the Seattle Seahawks and started every game of the 2011 season. Highlights of that season included a Seattle-record 94 yard interception return against the New York Giants in a Week 5 victory and two interceptions in a win against Vince Young and the Philadelphia Eagles on December 1, 2011. Browner was suspended for four games in 2012 for violating the NFL's performance-enhancing drug policy for using a prescription drug. Despite this setback, Browner was added to the 2012 Pro Bowl roster as a replacement for an injured Carlos Rogers.

On December 18, 2013, the NFL erroneously reported Browner was facing an indefinite suspension for again violating the NFL's performance-enhancing drug rules. The suspension kept him from playing in Super Bowl XLVIII against the Denver Broncos. Without Browner, the Seahawks won the Super Bowl 43-8 to give the franchise their first championship.

The suspension was later changed to reflect a substance abuse issue related to missing drug tests during the time Browner was unsigned by an NFL team and played football in the CFL, prior to the Seahawks contract. On March 4, 2014, he was officially reinstated by the NFL. His suspension was reduced to the first four games of the 2014 season.

New England Patriots
On March 14, 2014, Browner signed with the New England Patriots on a three-year, $17 million contract. After serving his 4-game suspension, Browner was inactive for the next 2 games. He made his season debut in week 7 against the New York Jets, where Browner recorded a tackle. Browner finished the season with 25 tackles and an interception in 9 games. He helped the Patriots win Super Bowl XLIX over his former team, the Seattle Seahawks 28-24. In the Super Bowl, Browner recorded 3 tackles. With 26 seconds left, he blocked Jermaine Kearse on a pick play on second and goal from the one yard line, enabling Malcolm Butler to make the game-sealing interception.

At the start of free agency, the Patriots did not pick up a $2 million roster bonus due to him, making him a free agent eligible to sign with any team.

New Orleans Saints
On March 12, 2015, Browner signed with the New Orleans Saints. In September, he was elected as one of the defensive team captains (along with Cameron Jordan). Browner finished with 76 tackles and 1 interception. Browner's year in New Orleans was not a successful one: he ended the season rated as one of the least effective cornerbacks in the league, and received more penalties for the season than any player in the league since this statistic began tracking in 1999.  On February 2, 2016, Browner tweeted that the Saints were going to release him. On March 10, Browner was released. In late May 2016, Browner received attention when he responded to criticism from a Saints fan on Instagram about his performance and salary, stating that he "took that few millions (and) ran with it" when he left the Saints.

Seattle Seahawks (second stint)
On April 17, 2016, Browner signed a one-year deal for the veteran minimum salary ($760,000) with his former team, the Seattle Seahawks, reforming the original Legion of Boom. Seahawks head coach Pete Carroll stated Browner would play a different role than the previous stint with the Seahawks as a hybrid corner/safety/linebacker in the nickel package. However, the Seahawks released Browner on August 29, after the team's third preseason game.

Flag Football
In 2018, Browner was a member of the Roadrunners led by retired quarterback Michael Vick as part of the American Flag Football League.

NFL career statistics

Regular season

In 2015 Browner led the NFL in penalties committed during the regular season, and was 2nd in 2011 and 2014.

Seahawks franchise records
 Most interception yards returned (season): 220 (2011)

Legal issues
In May 2017, Browner was arrested by Los Angeles police for possession of cocaine and being under the influence.

On July 8, 2018, Browner was arrested by La Verne police for breaking and entering into the residence of a woman with whom he once had a relationship, and fleeing the scene after stealing a Rolex within the home. Two days later, he was officially charged with attempted murder and three other felonies. On December 4, 2018, Browner was sentenced to 8 years in prison after pleading no contest to an attempted murder charge. Browner is now serving his sentence at San Quentin State Prison.

References

External links
Calgary Stampeders bio
Seattle Seahawks bio 
New England Patriots bio

1984 births
Living people
Players of American football from Los Angeles
African-American players of Canadian football
American players of Canadian football
American football cornerbacks
Canadian football defensive backs
Oregon State Beavers football players
Calgary Stampeders players
Denver Broncos players
Seattle Seahawks players
New England Patriots players
New Orleans Saints players
National Conference Pro Bowl players
American sportspeople convicted of crimes
21st-century African-American sportspeople
20th-century African-American people
Players of Canadian football from Los Angeles